Andrew Vincent Dismukes (born June 21, 1995) is an American comedian, actor, and writer. Dismukes was hired as a writer for the NBC sketch comedy series Saturday Night Live in 2017, ahead of its 43rd season. He was then hired to join the cast as a featured player in 2020 for its 46th season, and became a repertory player during its 48th season in 2022.

Early life 
Andrew Vincent Dismukes was born on June 21, 1995 in Houston, Texas. He grew up in Port Neches, Texas, a small Gulf Coast city located near the Texas-Louisiana border. Dismukes graduated from Port Neches-Groves High School in 2013. He attended the University of Texas at Austin, graduating in 2017 with a Bachelor of Science degree in Radio-Television-Film. He is of Cajun descent.

Career 
Dismukes began performing stand-up in 2013, while a freshman in college, and was active in the Austin comedy scene. He was the runner-up "Funniest Person in Austin" in 2016, a contest run by the Cap City Comedy Club.

Following his graduation in 2017, he performed as part of the New Faces showcase at the Just for Laughs Comedy Festival and was subsequently offered an audition for Saturday Night Live. Dismukes was offered a writer's position and officially joined the writing staff at the beginning of season 43. As part of the writing staff, he received an Emmy nomination for the Outstanding Writing For A Variety Series in 2018 and 2019. After serving as a writer for three seasons with Saturday Night Live, Dismukes joined the cast as a featured player for its forty-sixth season. He was promoted to repertory status at the start of the show's 48th season.

Filmography

Awards and nominations

References

External links 

 
 
 
 Andrew Dismukes on NBC

1995 births
21st-century American comedians
21st-century American screenwriters
American comedy writers
American male comedians
American male television actors
American male television writers
American sketch comedians
American stand-up comedians
Cajun people
Comedians from Texas
Living people
Moody College of Communication alumni
People from Port Neches, Texas